Jeff Masterman is an Australian former professional rugby league footballer who played in the 1970s and 1980s. He played for the Eastern Suburbs.

Originally from Kurri Kurri, New South Wales, Jeff Masterman made an immediate impact in his debut season at the Sydney Roosters in 1981, winning the Dally M Rookie of the year and the Dally M hooker of the year.  He also gained selection for the New South Wales rugby league team and the Australia - playing two test matches against France in 1981. He is listed on the Australian Rugby League Players Register as Kangaroo No.532. He played four seasons with the Sydney Roosters between 1981-1983 and 1985, before injuries ended his career prematurely. In 2010 he was named in Kurri Rugby League Club's team of the century.

References

External links
Jeff Masterman at rugbyleagueproject.org

1957 births
Living people
Australian rugby league players
Sydney Roosters players
New South Wales rugby league team players
Australia national rugby league team players
Kurri Kurri Bulldogs players
Rugby league hookers
Rugby league players from Kurri Kurri